Murton Fell is a hill of  above the village of Murton, Cumbria in Eden district, in the North Pennines. It lies east of the dramatic valley of High Cup Nick

It lies on the central watershed of England, as it is drained to the south west into the River Eden flowing into the Solway Firth, and to the north east into the River Tees and ultimately the North Sea.

References

Mountains and hills of the Pennines
Mountains and hills of Cumbria
Hewitts of England
Nuttalls
Murton, Cumbria